, also known as New Bust-a-Move, is a tile-matching puzzle video game developed by Moss and published by Taito for iOS. The game was released worldwide on February 4, 2011, followed by the HD version on March 9, and features integration with Game Center.

Reception

The game received above-average reviews according to the review aggregation website Metacritic.

References

External links
 Official website
 

2011 video games
Bubble Bobble
IOS games
IOS-only games
Tile-matching video games
Video games developed in Japan